Tyrone Bradley Thomas "Brad" Cooper (born June 30, 1957) is a retired male discus thrower and shot putter from the Bahamas. He competed for his native country in two consecutive Summer Olympics, starting in 1984. Cooper set his personal best, in the discus event on June 14, 1986, in Nassau.

Competition record

References
 
 
 1984 Year Ranking

External links
 
 

1957 births
Living people
Florida State University alumni
Florida State Seminoles men's track and field athletes
Bahamian discus throwers
Bahamian shot putters
Athletes (track and field) at the 1984 Summer Olympics
Athletes (track and field) at the 1988 Summer Olympics
Athletes (track and field) at the 1978 Commonwealth Games
Athletes (track and field) at the 1982 Commonwealth Games
Athletes (track and field) at the 1979 Pan American Games
Athletes (track and field) at the 1983 Pan American Games
Athletes (track and field) at the 1987 Pan American Games
Athletes (track and field) at the 1990 Commonwealth Games
Athletes (track and field) at the 1994 Commonwealth Games
Bahamian sportsperson-politicians
Commonwealth Games gold medallists for the Bahamas
Commonwealth Games silver medallists for the Bahamas
Commonwealth Games medallists in athletics
Members of the House of Assembly of the Bahamas
Place of birth missing (living people)
Government ministers of the Bahamas
Male discus throwers
Male shot putters
Bahamian male athletes
Pan American Games medalists in athletics (track and field)
Pan American Games silver medalists for the Bahamas
Olympic athletes of the Bahamas
Medalists at the 1979 Pan American Games
Medalists at the 1983 Pan American Games
Medalists at the 1987 Pan American Games
Central American and Caribbean Games medalists in athletics
Central American and Caribbean Games silver medalists for the Bahamas
Central American and Caribbean Games bronze medalists for the Bahamas
Competitors at the 1978 Central American and Caribbean Games
Competitors at the 1982 Central American and Caribbean Games
Competitors at the 1986 Central American and Caribbean Games
Medallists at the 1982 Commonwealth Games